Trun railway station is a railway station in the municipality of Trun, in the Swiss canton of Graubünden. It is an intermediate stop on the  gauge Reichenau-Tamins–Disentis/Mustér line of the Rhaetian Railway.

Services
The following services stop at Trun:

References

External links 
 
 

Railway stations in Graubünden
Rhaetian Railway stations
Railway stations in Switzerland opened in 1912